General Thomas Casey Lyons  (9 July 1829 – 13 September 1897) was a British Army officer who became General Officer Commanding Western District.

Early life
Born in County Limerick, Lyons was the fourth son of Bridgette Kennedy and James Denis Lyons of Croome House, grandson of Thomas Casey, MP for Kilmallock.

Military career
Lyons was commissioned into the 16th Regiment of Foot in 1845. He saw action at the Siege of Lucknow during the Indian Rebellion in 1857. He became Commander of the 1st Infantry Brigade in April 1884 and General Officer Commanding Western District in April 1885 and went on to serve as Governor of Bermuda from 1892 to 1896.

References

|-

British Army generals
1829 births
1897 deaths
Companions of the Order of the Bath
Bedfordshire and Hertfordshire Regiment officers
Military personnel from County Limerick